Pogrebishchi is a rural locality (a village) in Vyatkinskoye Rural Settlement, Sudogodsky District, Vladimir Oblast, Russia. The population was 46 as of 2010. There are 10 streets.

Geography 
Pogrebishchi is located 35 km northwest of Sudogda (the district's administrative centre) by road. Vyatkino is the nearest rural locality.

References 

Rural localities in Sudogodsky District
Vladimirsky Uyezd